Carroll William Sembera (July 26, 1941 – June 15, 2005) was an American professional baseball relief pitcher, who played in Major League Baseball (MLB) for the Houston Astros (1965–67) and Montreal Expos (1969–70). Sembera batted and threw right-handed.

In a five-season career, Sembera posted a 3–11 record with a 4.70 ERA and six saves in 99 games pitched.

Sembera made his MLB debut with the Houston Astros in 1965 at the age of 23. In 1967, he recorded career-highs in games (45), innings pitched (59.2) and games finished (15). Sembera also pitched for the Montreal Expos in 1969 and 1970.

Following his career as a player, Sembera scouted for the Major League Scouting Bureau and with the Seattle Mariners for eleven years. 

Sembera died in his hometown of Shiner, Texas, at the age of 63.

References

External links

Carroll Sembera at Baseball Almanac
Carroll Sembera at Astros Daily
Carroll Sembera at Historic Baseball

1941 births
2005 deaths
American expatriate baseball players in Canada
Amarillo Sonics players
Baseball players from Texas
Buffalo Bisons (minor league) players
Durham Bulls players
Houston Astros players
Indianapolis Indians players
Major League Baseball pitchers
Major League Baseball scouts
Modesto Colts players
Montreal Expos players
Moultrie Colt .22s players
Oklahoma City 89ers players
People from Shiner, Texas
Seattle Mariners scouts
Tigres de Aragua players
American expatriate baseball players in Venezuela
Trinity Tigers baseball players
Tulsa Oilers (baseball) players
Vancouver Mounties players
Winnipeg Whips players